Steirodiscus is a genus of South African plants in the groundsel tribe within the Asteraceae.

Some species are used as garden plants. Cultivars include 'Gold Rush'.

 Species

 formerly included
Steirodiscus chrysanthemoides - Euryops chrysanthemoides

References

Senecioneae
Asteraceae genera
Endemic flora of South Africa